Bayley Simpson  (born ) is a Canadian male track cyclist, representing Canada at international competitions. He won the gold medal at the 2016–17 UCI Track Cycling World Cup in Apeldoorn in the team pursuit. Currently studies kinesiology at McMaster University.

References

1997 births
Living people
Canadian male cyclists
Canadian track cyclists
Place of birth missing (living people)